Random Thoughts, alternatively Thinking Here and There or Wondering Music, is the translated title of a 1994 Cantonese album recorded by Chinese Cantopop singer Faye Wong when she was based in Hong Kong. It confirmed her move into alternative music and covers songs by the Cocteau Twins, whose influence she readily acknowledged.

The title track "Random Thoughts" is a cover of the Cocteau Twins' "Bluebeard". Track 5, "Know Oneself and Each Other", covered their song "Know Who You Are at Every Age", which was likewise from their 1993 album Four-Calendar Café.

"Dream Lover" (sometimes translated "Person in a Dream") is a cover of The Cranberries' "Dreams". It was a successful hit single, and was featured in Wong Kar-wai's critically acclaimed film Chungking Express in which Faye Wong also starred. She also recorded a Mandarin version, "Elude", on Sky. Both versions are still played frequently in Chinese media.

Track listing

Cover art
The album cover was unusual for its time: instead of any image of the singer's face, the main cover design shows overlapping phrases such as "no new images" and "no photo booklet" in Chinese characters of varying size, all of which have some strokes missing but allowing the phrase still to be discerned. An alternative cover was all white except for the artist and album name, the latter in the same partial characters.

The cover was the first to include the Mandarin name 王菲 (Wang Fei).

References

1994 albums
Faye Wong albums
Cinepoly Records albums
Cantopop albums